Complicité is a British theatre company founded in 1983 by Simon McBurney, Annabel Arden, Marcello Magni and Fiona Gordon. Its original name was Théâtre de Complicité. The company is based in London and uses extreme movement to represent their work, with surrealist imagery. Its work has been influenced by Jacques Lecoq. The company produced their first performance in 1983. In 1985 they won the Perrier Comedy Award at the Edinburgh Fringe Festival. Their productions often involve technology such as projection and cameras, and cover serious themes.

They describe the main principles of their work as "seeing what is most alive, integrating text, music, image and action to create surprising, disruptive theatre".

The company's lineup changes frequently, though McBurney continues to be the artistic director. Complicité is currently more active as an international touring company than within the United Kingdom. The Company is based in London but tours the UK and internationally.

Major productions

Major productions include The Master and Margarita (2011/12), A Dog's Heart (2010) with De Nederlandse Opera and English National Opera, Endgame (2009),  Shun-kin (2008), A Disappearing Number (2007), Measure for Measure (2004), The Elephant Vanishes (2003, 2004) (performed in Japanese, adapted from the work of the writer Haruki Murakami), The Noise of Time (2000) (about the Russian composer Dimitri Shostakovich, title from the 1925 memoir and collected essays by the poet Osip Mandelstam, published in English in 1993); Mnemonic (1999); and The Street of Crocodiles (1992) (inspired by the life and works of Bruno Schulz).

The Master and Margarita, an adaptation of Mikhail Bulgakov’s novel, sold out its run at The Barbican, London in March/April 2012 and toured Europe in 2012. In 2010 A Disappearing Number (2010, 2008, 2007) which played at the Novello Theatre, Barbican Theatre and Theatre Royal, Plymouth, is a play about the mathematicians Ramanujan and G. H. Hardy, the study of pure mathematics, the concepts of infinity and string theory. It focuses on our "relentless compulsion to understand". The music was written by Nitin Sawhney and the dramaturge was Ben Power. The play won many awards, including the Laurence Olivier Award 2008 for Best New Play. It was produced at the Lincoln Center Festival in New York City in 2010 and toured to Mumbai and Hyderabad. In 2010 it was broadcast to over 300 cinema screens worldwide as part of NT Live.

Shun-kin (2008), performed in Japanese, was adapted from Junichiro Tanizaki. It was first performed in Tokyo (February 2008) and then toured to London. It was revived in Tokyo in March 2009 and in London, Paris, Tokyo and Taipei in 2010.

Europe Theatre Prize 
In 1997, the Théâtre de Complicité and its artistic director Simon McBurney were awarded the III Europe Prize Theatrical Realities, with the following motivation:Théâtre de Complicité, which is one of the most original and inventive British theatre companies, was founded in 1983. It was created by four young people whose aim was to bring the physical disciplines they had learned at the Jacques Lecoq Mime School in Paris to the largely text-based British theatre. But over the last thirteen years the company has not only acquired an international reputation, it has also grown organically. It now combines a strong mimetic skill with the exploration of complex literary texts. It has forged its own uniquely brilliant style which makes it a worthy winner of the Europe Prize Theatrical Realities. Its founder members were Simon McBurney, Marcello Magno, Fiona Gordon who had all studied together in Paris and Annabel Arden who was a contemporary of Simon at Cambridge University. The first production, Put It On Your Head, was a darkly hilarious examination of an English seaside resort and attracted modest attention. There followed a series of shows dealing with such subjects as our attitudes to death, food, Christmas and office-life. Gradually built up a following for its original vision, grotesque comedy and dazzling mime. But the breakthrough came in 1988 when it presented a 15-weeks season of its work at London's Almeida Theatre including its first ever production of an existing text: a version of Durrenmatt's The visit which contained a prize winning performance by Kathryn Hunter as the vengeful plutocrat and which used mime to recreate the atmosphere of a small, run-down European town. Peter Brook, who saw the production, rated it as superior to his own version in the late '50s. Since then Complicite has become one of the most sought-after companies on the international touring circuit and has adapted literaly texts to the stage including Bruno Schulz's Street of Crocodiles, John Berger' s The Three Lives of Lucie Cabrol and J.M. Coetzee's Foe. But it has expanded its range and style without sacrifing its experimental instinct or physical discipline. Above all, it shows an astonishing ability to re-create whole communities such as that of a small Polish town in Street of Crocodiles and a peasant village in the Hautes-Alpes in Lucie Cabrol. Complicite are currently working on a co-production of Brecht's The Caucasian Chalk Circle with the National Theatre of Great Britain. But it remains one of the most audacious and genuinely experimental companies at work in European Theatre today.

Funding
Other than revenue from ticket sales, Complicité receives funding from two sources: Arts Council England and private donations.

"Complicité creates inspirational physical-based theatre, which it tours both nationally and internationally to world-class venues and partners. The company also provides a programme of professional workshops and educational initiatives. Our funding supports core costs." Complicité received £370,021 in 2008/2009, £380,012 in 2009/2010 and £390,272 in 2010/2011 from the Council.

Productions index

References

External links
Complicite

Theatre companies in the United Kingdom
Physical theatre